Chloe Maayan (Chinese: 曾美慧孜; born October 3, 1988), also known as Zeng Meihuizi, is a Chinese actress and director. She was nominated at 55th Golden Horse Award for Best Leading Actress, won 38th Hong Kong Film Awards and 25th Hong Kong Film Critics Society Awards for Best Actress for her role in Three Husbands.

Filmography

Film

Short film

Television series

Awards and nominations

References

External links

1988 births
Living people
21st-century Chinese actresses
Chinese film actresses